Nationality words link to articles with information on the nation's poetry or literature (for instance, Irish or France).

Events
 March 15 – Revolutions of 1848 in the Austrian Empire: Hungarian Revolution of 1848 – Hungarian poet Sándor Petőfi with Mihály Táncsics and other young men lead the bloodless revolution in Pest, reciting Petőfi's "Nemzeti dal" (National song) and the "12 points" and printing them on the presses of Landerer es Heckenast, forcing Ferdinand I of Austria to abolish censorship
 Pre-Raphaelite Brotherhood founded by Dante Gabriel Rossetti, William Holman Hunt, and John Everett Millais in England
 End of the Biedermeier era of German literature, which began in 1815. The name is derived from a parody in the Munich magazine Fliegende Blätter of 1848 by Ludwig Eichrodt and Dr. Adolph Kussmaul of two poems by Joseph Victor von Scheffel, "Biedermanns Abendgemütlichkeit" ("Biedermann's Evening Comfort") and "Bummelmaiers Klage" ("Bummelmaier's Complaint")

Works published in English

United Kingdom
 Cecil Frances Alexander, The Baron's Little Daughter, and Other Tales in Prose and Verse
 William Edmondstoune Aytoun, Lays of the Scottish Cavaliers, Scotland
 John Stanyan Bigg, The Sea-King
 Arthur Hugh Clough, The Bothie of Tober-na-Vuolich: A Long-Vacation Pastoral
 Robert Davidson, Leaves from a Peasant's Cottage Drawer, Scotland
 Aubrey Thomas de Vere, English Misrule and Irish Deeds
 Dora Greenwell, Poems
 John Keats, Ode on Indolence first published, posthumously (the author died in 1821)
 Charles Kingsley, The Saint's Tragedy
 Walter Savage Landor, The Italics of Walter Savage Landor
 Monckton Milnes, Life, Letters and Literary Remains of John Keats

United States
 John Quincy Adams, Poems of Religion and Society
 Rufus Wilmot Griswold, Female Poets of America, anthology
 Henry Beck Hirst, Endymion
 James Russell Lowell:
The Biglow Papers (1848)
A Fable for Critics: A Glance at a Few of Our Literary Progenies, book-length poem published as a pamphlet
Poems: Second Series
The Vision of Sir Launfal
 Fitz-Greene Halleck, The Poetical Works of Fitz-Greene Halleck, Now First Collected, New York: D. Appleton & Company
 James Mathewes Legare, Orta-Undis, and Other Poems, the only book of poetry published in the author's lifetime; Boston: Ticknor and Company, printed at the author's expense
 Edgar Allan Poe, Eureka: A Prose Poem, United States
 Adrien Rouquette, Wild Flowers: Sacred Poetry
 William Gilmore Simms:
 The Eye and the Wing, New York 
 Lays of the Palmetto: a Tribute to the South Carolina Regiment in the War with Mexico, Charleston
 The Cassique of Accabee
 Charleston and Her Satirists: A Scribblement
 William Ross Wallace, Alban the Pirate

Works published in other languages
 José Bonifácio, Rosas e Goivos ("Roses and Cresses"), Brazil
 James Huston, editor, Le répertoire national, anthology of French Canadian poetry in four volumes, published from this year to 1850, including poetry by Joseph Mermet ("Les Boucheries: fêtes rurales du Canada"), Isidore Bédard ("Sol canadien, terre chérie"), François-Xavier Garneau, Napoléon Aubin, François-Magloire Derome and Pierre Chauveau
 Andreas Munch, Digte, gamle og nye, Norway
 Johan Ludvig Runeberg, The Tales of Ensign Stål (Swedish original title:), first part, Finland

Births

Death years link to the corresponding "[year] in poetry" article:
 February 17 – Louisa Lawson, née Albury (died 1920), Australian poet, writer, publisher and feminist; mother of Henry Lawson
 August 13 – Romesh Chunder Dutt (died 1909), Indian poet writing in English; cousin of Toru Dutt
 Undated – Gobinda Rath (died 1918), Indian, Oriya-language poet and satirist

Deaths
Birth years link to the corresponding "[year] in poetry" article:
 January 19 – Isaac D'Israeli (born 1766), English scholar and man of letters
 February 11 – Thomas Cole (born 1801), English-born American landscape painter and occasional poet
 February 23 – John Quincy Adams (born 1767), American statesman, sixth President of the United States
 May 25 – Annette von Droste-Hulshoff (born 1797), German author and poet
 August 14 – Sarah Fuller Flower Adams (born 1805), English religious poet (tuberculosis)
 September 24 – Branwell Brontë (born 1817), English painter, writer and poet (tuberculosis)
 December 19 – Emily Brontë (born 1818), English novelist and poet (tuberculosis)
 Undated – Ann Batten Cristall (born c. 1769), English
Undated – Leyla Khanim, Turkish woman poet

See also

 19th century in poetry
 19th century in literature
 List of years in poetry
 List of years in literature
 Victorian literature
 French literature of the 19th century
 Biedermeier era of German literature
 Golden Age of Russian Poetry (1800–1850)
 Young Germany (Junges Deutschland) a loose group of German writers from about 1830 to 1850
 List of poets
 Poetry
 List of poetry awards

Notes

19th-century poetry
Poetry